Ruy de Sosa y León, (1569–1633) was a Portuguese nobleman, and conqueror and government official of the city of Córdoba in what is now Argentina during the Spanish colonization of the Americas.

Biography
Born in 1569 in Lisbon, Portugal, he was the son of Garcia Sousa and Dona Isabel Nunes. He married in the city of Córdoba to Gregoria Peralta, daughter of Blas de Peralta.

Ruy de Sosa arrived in Córdoba from Peru sent as conqueror and councilman, was appointed chief alguacil, attorney, majordomo and city treasurer.

References

External links
Capillasytemplos.com.ar

1569 births
1633 deaths
Portuguese nobility
Spanish colonial governors and administrators